Emil Bömches (9 July 1879 – 27 January 1969) was a Hungarian sports shooter. He competed in four events at the 1912 Summer Olympics.

References

External links
 

1879 births
1969 deaths
Hungarian male sport shooters
Olympic shooters of Hungary
Shooters at the 1912 Summer Olympics
People from Sebeș